2-Hydroxyestrone (2-OHE1), also known as estra-1,3,5(10)-trien-2,3-diol-17-one, is an endogenous, naturally occurring catechol estrogen and a major metabolite of estrone and estradiol. It is formed irreversibly from estrone in the liver and to a lesser extent in other tissues via 2-hydroxylation mediated by cytochrome P450 enzymes, mainly the CYP3A and CYP1A subfamilies. 2-OHE1 is the most abundant catechol estrogen in the body.

2-Hydroxyestrone is not significantly uterotrophic in bioassays, whereas other hydroxylated estrogen metabolites including 2-hydroxyestradiol, 16α-hydroxyestrone, estriol (16α-hydroxyestradiol), 4-hydroxyestradiol, and 4-hydroxyestrone all are. In addition, although not antiestrogenic in the uterus, 2-hydroxyestrone shows antiestrogenic effects on luteinizing hormone and prolactin levels. The lack of estrogenic or antiestrogenic activity of 2-hydroxyestrone in the uterus may be attributable to an extremely high metabolic clearance rate. When incubated at very high concentrations or in combination with a catechol O-methyltransferase (COMT) inhibitor to prevent its metabolism, 2-hydroxyestrone shows antiestrogenic effects in estrogen receptor-positive human breast cancer cells.

2-Hydroxyestrone dissociates from the estrogen receptors much more rapidly than does estradiol.

See also
 2-Methoxyestradiol
 Estrogen conjugate
 Lipoidal estrogen

References

External links
 Metabocard for 2-Hydroxyestrone (HMDB12623) - Human Metabolome Database

Catechol-O-methyltransferase inhibitors
Diols
Estranes
Human metabolites
Selective estrogen receptor modulators
Tyrosine hydroxylase inhibitors